Othello (full title: The Tragedy of Othello, the Moor of Venice) is a tragedy written by William Shakespeare, probably in 1603. The story revolves around two characters, Othello and Iago. 

Othello is a Moorish military commander who was serving as a general of the Venetian army in defence of Cyprus against invasion by Ottoman Turks. He has recently married Desdemona, a beautiful and wealthy Venetian lady much younger than himself, against the wishes of her father. Iago is Othello's malevolent ensign, who maliciously stokes his master's jealousy until the usually stoic Moor kills his beloved wife in a fit of blind rage. Due to its enduring themes of passion, jealousy, and race, Othello is still topical and popular and is widely performed, with numerous adaptations.

Characters

 Othello – General in the Venetian military, a noble Moor
 Desdemona – Othello's wife; daughter of Brabantio
 Iago – Othello's trusted, but jealous and traitorous ensign
 Cassio – Othello's loyal and most beloved captain
 Emilia – Iago's wife and Desdemona's maidservant
 Bianca – Cassio's lover
 Brabantio – Venetian senator and Desdemona's father (can also be called Brabanzio)
 Roderigo – dissolute Venetian, in love with Desdemona
 Duke of Venice
 Gratiano – Brabantio's brother
 Lodovico – Brabantio's kinsman and Desdemona's cousin
 Montano – Othello's Venetian predecessor in the government of Cyprus
 Clown – servant
 Senators
 Sailor
 Officers, Gentlemen, Messenger, Herald, Attendants, Musicians, etc.

Plot

Act I
Roderigo, a wealthy and dissolute gentleman, complains to his friend Iago, an ensign, that Iago has not told him about the recent secret marriage between Desdemona, the daughter of Brabantio, a senator, and Othello, a Moorish general in the Venetian army. Roderigo is upset because he loves Desdemona and had asked her father, Brabantio, for her hand in marriage.

Iago hates Othello for promoting a younger man named Cassio above him, whom Iago considers a less capable soldier than himself. Iago tells Roderigo that he plans to exploit Othello for his own advantage and convinces Roderigo to wake Brabantio and tell him about his daughter's elopement. Meanwhile, Iago sneaks away to find Othello and warns him that Brabantio is coming for him.

Brabantio, provoked by Roderigo, is enraged and seeks to confront Othello, but he finds Othello's residence full of the Duke of Venice's guards, who prevent violence. News has arrived in Venice that the Turks are going to attack Cyprus, and Othello is therefore summoned to advise the senators. Brabantio has no option but to accompany Othello to the Duke's residence, where he accuses Othello of seducing Desdemona by witchcraft.

Othello defends himself before the Duke of Venice, Brabantio's kinsmen Lodovico and Gratiano, and various senators. Othello explains that, while he was invited to Brabantio's home, Desdemona became enamoured of him for the sad and compelling stories he told of his life before Venice, not because of any witchcraft. The senate is satisfied once Desdemona confirms that she loves Othello, but Brabantio leaves, saying that Desdemona will betray Othello: "Look to her, Moor, if thou hast eyes to see. She has deceived her father, and may thee" (Act I, Sc 3). Iago, still in the room, takes note of Brabantio's remark. By order of the Duke, Othello leaves Venice to command the Venetian armies against invading Turks on the island of Cyprus, accompanied by his new wife, his new lieutenant Cassio, his ensign Iago, and Iago's wife, Emilia, as Desdemona's attendant.

Act II
The party arrives in Cyprus to find that a storm has destroyed the Turkish fleet. Othello orders a general celebration and leaves to consummate his marriage with Desdemona. In his absence, Iago gets Cassio drunk, and then persuades Roderigo to draw Cassio into a fight. Montano tries to calm down an angry and drunk Cassio. This leads to them fighting one another and Montano being injured. Othello arrives and questions the men as to what happened. Othello blames Cassio for the disturbance and strips him of his rank. Cassio, distraught, is then persuaded by Iago to ask Desdemona to persuade her husband to reinstate him.

Act III
Iago persuades Othello to be suspicious of Cassio and Desdemona's relationship. When Desdemona drops a handkerchief (the first gift given to her by Othello), Emilia finds it and gives it to Iago at his request, unaware of what he plans to do with it. Othello appears and, then being convinced by Iago of his wife's unfaithfulness with his captain, vows with Iago for the death of Desdemona and Cassio, after which he makes Iago his lieutenant.

Act IV
Iago plants the handkerchief in Cassio's lodgings, then tells Othello to watch Cassio's reactions while Iago questions him. Iago goads Cassio on to talk about his affair with Bianca, a local courtesan, but whispers her name so quietly that Othello believes the two men are talking about Desdemona. Later, Bianca accuses Cassio of giving her a second-hand gift which he had received from another lover. Othello sees this, and Iago convinces him that Cassio received the handkerchief from Desdemona.

Enraged and hurt, Othello resolves to kill his wife and tells Iago to kill Cassio. Othello proceeds to make Desdemona's life miserable and strikes her in front of visiting Venetian nobles. Meanwhile, Roderigo complains that he has received no results from Iago in return for his money and efforts to win Desdemona, but Iago convinces him to kill Cassio.

Act V
Roderigo unsuccessfully attacks Cassio in the street after Cassio leaves Bianca's lodgings, as Cassio wounds Roderigo. During the scuffle, Iago comes from behind Cassio and badly cuts his leg. In the darkness, Iago manages to hide his identity, and when Lodovico and Gratiano hear Cassio's cries for help, Iago joins them. When Cassio identifies Roderigo as one of his attackers, Iago secretly stabs Roderigo to death to stop him from revealing the plot. Iago then accuses Bianca of the failed conspiracy to kill Cassio.

Othello confronts a sleeping Desdemona. She denies being unfaithful, but he smothers her. Emilia arrives, and Desdemona defends her husband before dying, and Othello accuses Desdemona of adultery. Emilia calls for help. The former governor Montano arrives with Gratiano and Iago. When Othello mentions the handkerchief as proof, Emilia realizes what Iago has done, and she exposes him. Othello, belatedly realising Desdemona's innocence, stabs Iago (but not fatally), saying that Iago is a devil, but not before the latter stabs Emilia to death in the scuffle.

Iago refuses to explain his motives, vowing to remain silent from that moment on. Lodovico apprehends both Iago and Othello for the murders of Roderigo, Emilia, and Desdemona, but Othello commits suicide. Lodovico appoints Cassio as Othello's successor and exhorts him to punish Iago justly. He then denounces Iago for his actions and leaves to tell the others what has happened.

Date and sources

Based on its style, the play is usually dated 1603 or 1604, but arguments have been made for dates as early as 1601 or 1602. The play was entered into the Register of the Stationers Company on 6 October 1621, by Thomas Walkley, and was first published in quarto format by him in 1622:

One year later, the play was included among the plays in the First Folio of Shakespeare's collected plays. However, the version in the Folio is rather different in length, and in wording: as the editors of the Folger edition explain: "The Folio play has about 160 lines that do not appear in the Quarto. Some of these cluster together in quite extensive passages. The Folio also lacks a scattering of about a dozen lines or part-lines that are to be found in the Quarto. These two versions also differ from each other in their readings of numerous words." Scholars differ in their explanation of these differences, and no consensus has emerged. Kerrigan suggests that the 1623 Folio version of Othello and a number of other plays may have been cleaned up relative to the Quarto to conform with the 1606 Act to Restrain Abuses, which made it an offence "in any Stage-play, Interlude, Shew, Maygame, or Pageant, iestingly [jestingly], and prophanely [to] speake, or vse the holy Name of God, or of Christ Iesus, or of the holy Ghost, or of the Trinitie". This is not incompatible with the suggestion that the Quarto is based on an early version of the play, whilst the Folio represents Shakespeare's revised version. It may also be that the Quarto was cut in the printing house to meet a fixed number of pages. Most modern editions are based on the longer Folio version, but often incorporate Quarto readings of words when the Folio text appears to be in error.

Othello is an adaptation of the Italian writer Cinthio's tale  ("A Moorish Captain") from his  (1565), a collection of one hundred tales in the style of Boccaccio's Decameron. No English translation of Cinthio was available in Shakespeare's lifetime, and verbal echoes in Othello are closer to the Italian original than to  1584 French translation. Cinthio's tale may have been based on an actual incident occurring in Venice about 1508. Desdemona is the only named character in Cinthio's tale, with his few other characters identified only as the "Moor", the "Squadron Leader", the "Ensign", and the "Ensign's Wife" (corresponding to the play's Othello, Cassio, Iago, and Emilia). Cinthio drew a moral (which he placed in the mouth of Desdemona) that it is unwise for European women to marry the temperamental men of other nations. Cinthio's tale has been described as a "partly racist warning" about the dangers of miscegenation.

While supplying the source of the plot, the book offered nothing of the sense of place of Venice or Cyprus. For knowledge of this, Shakespeare may have used Gasparo Contarini's The Commonwealth and Government of Venice, in Lewes Lewkenor's 1599 translation.

Another possible source was the Description of Africa by Leo Africanus. The book was an enormous success in Europe, and was translated into many other languages, remaining a definitive reference work for decades (and to some degree, centuries) afterwards. An English translation by John Pory appeared in 1600 under the title A Geographical Historie of Africa, Written in Arabicke and Italian by Iohn Leo a More... in which form Shakespeare may have seen it and reworked hints in creating the character of Othello.

Cinthio's "Moor" is the model for Shakespeare's Othello, but some researchers believe the poet also took inspiration from the several Moorish delegations from Morocco to Elizabethan England circa 1600.

Themes

Race

Although characters described as "Moors" appear in two other Shakespeare plays (Titus Andronicus and The Merchant of Venice), such characters were a rarity in contemporary theatre, and it was unknown for them to take centre stage.

There is no consensus over Othello's ethnic origin. In Elizabethan discourse, the word "black" could suggest various concepts that extended beyond the physical colour of skin, including a wide range of negative connotations. E. A. J. Honigmann, the editor of an Arden Shakespeare edition, concluded that Othello's race is ambiguous. "Renaissance representations of the Moor were vague, varied, inconsistent, and contradictory. As critics have established, the term 'Moor' referred to dark-skinned people in general, used interchangeably with terms such as 'African', 'Somali', 'Ethiopian', 'Negro', 'Arab', 'Berber', and even 'Indian' to designate a figure from Africa (or beyond)." Various uses of the word black (for example, "Haply for I am black") are insufficient evidence for any accurate racial classification, Honigmann argues, since black could simply mean swarthy to Elizabethans.

Othello is referred to as a "Barbary horse" (1.1.113) and a "lascivious Moor" (1.1.127). In 3.3 he denounces Desdemona's supposed sin as being "black as mine own face". Desdemona's physical whiteness is otherwise presented in opposition to Othello's dark skin: 5.2 "that whiter skin of hers than snow". Iago tells Brabantio that "an old black ram / is tupping your white ewe" (1.1.88). When Iago uses the word Barbary or Barbarian to refer to Othello, he seemingly refers to the Barbary coast inhabited by Berbers. Roderigo calls Othello "the thicklips", which seems to refer to Sub-Saharan African physiognomy, but Honigmann counters that, as these comments are all intended as insults by the characters, they need not be taken literally.

However, Jyotsna Singh wrote that the opposition of Brabantio to Desdemona marrying Othelloa respected and honoured generalcannot make sense except in racial terms, citing the scene where Brabantio accuses Othello of using witchcraft to make his daughter fall in love with him, saying it is "unnatural" for Desdemona to desire Othello's "sooty bosom". Singh argued that, since people with dark complexions are common in the Mediterranean area, a Venetian senator like Brabantio being opposed to Desdemona marrying Othello for merely being swarthy makes no sense, and that the character of Othello was intended to be black.

Michael Neill, editor of an Oxford edition, notes that the earliest critical references to Othello's colour (Thomas Rymer's 1693 critique of the play, and the 1709 engraving in Nicholas Rowe's edition of Shakespeare) assume him to be Sub-Saharan, while the earliest known North African interpretation was not until Edmund Kean's production of 1814. Honigmann discusses the view that Abd el-Ouahed ben Messaoud ben Mohammed Anoun, Moorish ambassador of the Arab sultan of Barbary (Morocco) to Queen Elizabeth I in 1600, was one inspiration for Othello. He stayed with his retinue in London for several months and occasioned much discussion. While Shakespeare's play was written only a few years afterwards, Honigmann questions the view that ben Messaoud himself was a significant influence on it.

Othello was frequently performed as an Arab Moor during the 19th century. He was first played by a black man on the London stage in 1833 by the most important of the nineteenth-century Othellos, the African American Ira Aldridge who had been forced to leave his home country to make his career. Regardless of what Shakespeare intended by calling Othello a "Moor" – whether he meant that Othello was a Muslim or a black man or both – in the 19th century and much of the 20th century, many critics tended to see the tragedy in racial terms, seeing interracial marriages as "aberrations" that could end badly. Given this view of Othello, the play became especially controversial in apartheid-era South Africa where interracial marriages were banned and performances of Othello were discouraged.

A vital component of the Protestant Reformation was the establishment among the general public of the importance of "pious, controlled behaviour". As such, "undesirable" qualities such as cruelty, treachery, jealousy and libidinousness were seen as qualities possessed by "the other". The assumed characteristics of Moors or "the other", were both instigated and popularised by Renaissance dramas of the time; for example, the treacherous behaviour of the Moors in George Peele's The Battle of Alcazar (1588).

Religious and philosophical

The title "Moor" implies a religious "other" of North African or Middle Eastern descent. Though the actual racial definition of the term is murky, the implications are religious as well as racial. Many critics have noted references to demonic possession throughout the play, especially in relation to Othello's seizure, a phenomenon often associated with possession in the popular consciousness of the day. Thomas M. Vozar, in a 2012 article in Philosophy and Literature, suggests that the epileptic seizure relates to the mind–body problem and the existence of the soul.

The hero
There have been many differing views on the character of Othello over the years. A.C. Bradley calls Othello the "most romantic of all of Shakespeare's heroes" (by "hero" Bradley means protagonist) and "the greatest poet of them all". On the other hand, F. R. Leavis describes Othello as "egotistical". There are those who also take a less critical approach to the character of Othello such as William Hazlitt, who said: "the nature of the Moor is noble ... but his blood is of the most inflammable kind". Conversely, many scholars have seen Iago as the anti-hero of the piece. W. H. Auden, for example, observed that "any consideration of [the play] must be primarily occupied, not with its official hero, but with its villain".

Legacy

Performance history

Shakespeare's day to the Interregnum 
Othello possesses an unusually detailed performance record. The first certainly known performance occurred on 1 November 1604, at Whitehall Palace in London, being mentioned in a Revels account on "Hallamas Day, being the first of Nouembar", 1604, when "the Kings Maiesties plaiers" performed "A Play in the Banketinge house at Whit Hall Called The Moor of Venis". The play is there attributed to "Shaxberd". Subsequent performances took place on Monday, 30 April 1610 at the Globe Theatre, and at Oxford in September 1610. On 22 November 1629, and on 6 May 1635, it played at the Blackfriars Theatre. Othello was also one of the twenty plays performed by the King's Men during the winter of 1612, in celebration of the wedding of Princess Elizabeth and Frederick V, Elector Palatine.

The title role was originally played by Richard Burbage, whose eulogies reveal that he was admired in the role. Moorish characters were conventionally played in turbans, with long white gowns and red trousers, with the actor's face darkened with lampblack or coal. The original Iago was likely John Lowin.

Restoration and 18th century 

All theatres were closed down by the Puritan government on 6 September 1642. Upon the restoration of the monarchy in 1660, two patent companies (the King's Company and the Duke's Company) were established, and the existing theatrical repertoire divided between them: Othello being allocated to the King's Company's repertoire. These patents stated that "all the women's parts to be acted in either of the said two companies for the time to come my be performed by women". The first professional acting appearance by a woman on the English stage was that of Desdemona in Othello on 8th December 1660, although history does not record who took the role.

In Restoration theatres, it was common for Shakespeare's plays to be adapted or rewritten. Othello was not adapted in this way, although it has often been cut to conform to current ideas of decorum or refinement. These cuts were not limited to removing violent and religious or sexual content, but extended on different occasions to removing references to eavesdropping, to Othello's fit, or to the entire role of Bianca.

The first professional performances of the play in North America are likely to have been those of the Hallam Company. Religious objections to theatre led them to perform Othello as a series of "moral dialogues" at Rhode Island in 1761.

19th century 

Paul Robeson's iconic performance (see 20th Century, below) was not the first professional performance of the title role by a black actor: the first known is James Hewlett at the African Grove Theatre, New York, in 1822. And Hewlett's protégé Ira Aldridge played many Shakespearean roles across Europe for forty years, including Othello at the Royalty Theatre, London, in 1825.

Throughout the eighteenth and nineteenth centuries, Othello was regarded as the most demanding of Shakespeare's roles: it is considered a part of theatre legend that Edmund Kean collapsed while playing the role, and died two months after.  Leigh Hunt saw Kean's Othello in 1819, describing his performance in The Examiner as "the masterpiece of the living stage". Before Kean, the leading exponent of the role had been John Philip Kemble who played a "neoclassical hero". In contrast, Kean presented Othello as a man of romantic temperament, and uncontrollable passion. It was also Kean who initiated the so-called "Bronze Age of Othello" by insisting that "it was a gross error to make Othello either a negro or a black" and thereby commencing a stage tradition of using lighter makeup rather than blackface.

For Tommaso Salvini and Edwin Booth the role of Othello was a career-length project. Salvini always played the role in Italian, even when acting alongside a company performing in English. His conception of the role was of a barbarian with savage and passionate instincts concealed by a thick veneer of civilisation. Konstantin Stanislavski admired, and was greatly influenced by, Salvini's Othello, which he saw in 1882. In My Life in Art, Stanislavski recalls Salvini's scene before the Senate, saying that the actor "grasped all of us in his palm, and held us there as if we were ants or flies". Booth, in complete contrast, played Othello as a restrained gentleman. When Ellen Terry played Desdemona she commented on how much Booth's style helped her: "It is difficult to preserve the simple, heroic blindness of Desdemona to the fact that her lord mistrusts her, if her lord is raving and stamping under her nose. Booth was gentle with Desdemona."

Stanislavski himself first played Othello in 1896. He was dissatisfied with his own performance, later recalling "I was able to reach nothing more than insane strain, spiritual and physical impotence, and the squeezing of tragic emotion out of myself."

20th century 

In 1930 Stanislavski directed a production of Othello for the Moscow Art Theatre, which was influential in the development of his system. The performance was directed remotely, by letter, while Stanislavski recovered from illness in France.

The most significant theatre production in wartime America featured Paul Robeson as Othello. Robeson had previously played the role in London in 1930 with a cast including Peggy Ashcroft, Sybil Thorndike and Ralph Richardson, and would later take the role for the RSC in 1959 at Stratford-Upon-Avon. Margaret Webster's 1943 Broadway production was considered a theatrical landmark, with Robeson (in the words of Howard Barnes) "making the Moor the great and terrible figure of tragedy which he has so rarely been on the stage." José Ferrer played Iago and Uta Hagen Desdemona. Taking the Broadway run with its subsequent tour, the show was seen by over half a million people. Earle Hyman saw the production numerous times when he was 17 and later recalled "this tremendous excitement - the first African-American onstage to be playing this role ... to all the blacks, he represented us. It was a moment of great pride."

In 1947, Kenneth Tynan saw Frederick Valk and Donald Wolfit play Othello and Iago respectively, and described the experience as equivalent to witnessing the Chicago Fire, the Quetta Earthquake or the Hiroshima Bomb.

When Laurence Olivier gave his acclaimed performance of Othello at the Royal National Theatre in 1964, he had developed a case of stage fright that was so profound that when he was alone onstage, Frank Finlay (who was playing Iago) would have to stand offstage where Olivier could see him to settle his nerves. (The filmed version of this production is discussed under "Screen" below.)

White actors continued to dominate the role until the 1980s. Willard White in 1989 was the first black actor to play Othello at Stratford since Paul Robeson thirty years earlier.

21st century 

In 2007, Othello opened at the Donmar Warehouse in London on 4 December 2007, directed by Michael Grandage, with Chiwetel Ejiofor as Othello, Ewan McGregor as Iago, Tom Hiddleston as Cassio, Kelly Reilly as Desdemona and Michelle Fairley as Emilia. Ejiofor, Hiddleston and Fairley all received nominations for Laurence Olivier Awards, with Ejiofor winning.

In 2009, stand-up comedian Lenny Henry played Othello, produced by Northern Broadsides in collaboration with West Yorkshire Playhouse.

In summer 2013, the Royal National Theatre produced the play with Adrian Lester in the title role and Rory Kinnear as Iago. Lester and Kinnear shared Evening Standard Theatre Award for Best Actor and Kinnear won the Laurence Olivier Award for Best Actor.

In September 2013, a Tamil adaptation titled Othello, the Fall of a Warrior was directed and produced in Singapore by Subramanian Ganesh.

In March 2016 the historian Onyeka produced a play entitled Young Othello, a fictional take on Othello's young life before the events of Shakespeare's play.

In June 2016, baritone and actor David Serero played the title role in a Moroccan adaptation featuring Judeo-Arabic songs and Verdi's opera version in New York.

In the fall of 2016, David Oyelowo starred and Daniel Craig appeared in a modern production of Othello at the New York Theatre Workshop Off-Broadway.

In 2017, Ben Naylor directed the play for the Pop-up Globe in Auckland, New Zealand, with Māori actor Te Kohe Tuhaka in the title role, Jasmine Blackborow as Desdemona and Haakon Smestad as Iago. The production transferred to Melbourne, Australia with another Māori  actor, Regan Taylor, taking over the title role.

In 2022, Queensland Theatre staged an adaptation by Jason Klarwein and Jimi Bani, set in the Torres Straits. It was performed in three languages; Kala Lagaw Ya, Yumplatok and English. Bani played Othello as a Torres Straits Islander and member of the Torres Straits Light Infantry Battalion during World War II.

Screen 

Othello has influenced many film makers, and often the results are adaptations, rather than performances of Shakespeare's text. The UK's National Film and Television Archive holds over 25 20th-Century films containing performances, adaptations or extracts from Othello including Anson Dyer's 1920 animated Othello, 1921's Carnival and its 1932 remake, the 1922 German film The Moor, the 1936 Men Are Not Gods, 1941's East of Piccadilly, George Cukor's 1947 A Double Life, Orson Welles in Return to Glennascaul and Welles' own Othello, Sergei Yutkevich's Russian language Othello discussed below, two productions for BBC Television (including Jonathan Miller's for the BBC Television Shakespeare series, discussed below), Basil Dearden's All Night Long, Janet Suzman's 1988 South African TV Othello, a film of Trevor Nunn's RSC production with Willard White and Ian McKellen in the central roles, and True Identity - a crime caper in which Lenny Henry's character Miles lands the role of understudy to James Earl Jones (playing himself) in a production of Othello.  Carnival, Men Are Not Gods and A Double Life all feature the plot of an actor playing the title role in Shakespeare's Othello developing murderous jealousy for their Desdemonas. This plot is also shared by the very first Othello-influenced film: the 18-minute Danish 1911 Desdemona. All Night Long reframes the story in a jazz milieu. And Richard Eyre's Stage Beauty depicts a restoration performance of the play.

The filming of Orson Welles' Othello was plagued by chaos. A pattern emerged where Welles would collect his cast and crew for filming, then after four or five weeks his money would run out and filming would cease: Welles would then appear in another movie, and using his acting fee would reconvene filming. Scenes in the final movie were sometimes spliced together from one actor filmed in Italy in one year, and another actor filmed in Morocco the next. Welles decimates Shakespeare's text, and uses shadows, extreme camera angles and discordant piano music to force the audience to feel Othello's disorientated view of Desdemona. The film was critically panned on its 1955 release (headlines included "Mr Welles Murders Shakespeare in the Dark" and "The Boor of Venice") but was acclaimed as a classic upon its re-release in a restored version in 1992.

Sergei Yutkevich's Russian film, with a screenplay by Boris Pasternak was an attempt to make Shakespeare accessible to "the working man". Yutkevitch had begun his career as a painter and then as a set designer, and his film was widely praised for its pictorial beauty. The director saw his film as an opposite of Welles': where Welles began his film with a sequence from the end of the story, highlighting fate, Yutkevitch began with his Othello's back-story, thereby highlighting his characters' free will. 

Laurence Olivier said that the role of Othello demanded "enormously big" acting, and he incorporated what The Spectator described as his "outsize, elaborate, overwhelming" performance into the film of his National Theatre production. The effect to modern audiences is (in the words of Daniel Rosenthal) "laughably over-the-top" - in keeping with its nature as a filmed stage performance, rather than a performance designed for the screen. The film was a financial success, and earned Oscar nominations for each of Olivier as Othello, Maggie Smith as Desdemona, Frank Finlay as Iago and Joyce Redman as Emilia. Subsequent critics have been less sympathetic to Olivier's performance than his contemporary audience had been, tending to read it as racist.

The last of the screen versions to portray Othello in blackface was Jonathan Miller's for the BBC Television Shakespeare series, with Anthony Hopkins in the title role. Miller is said to have commented that "the play is about jealousy, not race."

Oliver Parker's 1995 Othello was trailed as an "erotic thriller", including a ritualized love scene between Othello and Desdemona, and, most memorably, Othello's jealous fantasies of encounters between Desdemona and Cassio. Swiss actress Irène Jacob as Desdemona struggled with the verse, as did Laurence Fishburne, more experienced in expletive-ridden thriller roles, as Othello. Iago was Kenneth Branagh in his first outing as a screen villain. The overall effect was to create, in Douglas Brode's words "the tragedy of Iago" - a performance in which Iago's dominance is such that Othello is a foil to him, not the other way around. The film was described as a "fair stab at turning the Bard into a decent night at the multiplex" but failed to achieve success at the box office.

Other adaptations of Shakespeare's story to be filmed include Franco Zeffirelli's 1986 film of Verdi's Otello. The 1956 Jubal resets the story as a Western, centered on the Cassio character. The play was abridged to 30 minutes by Leon Garfield, and produced with cel animation for the TV series Shakespeare: The Animated Tales. Tim Blake Nelson's basketball-themed teen drama O reset the story at an elite boarding school. The similarity of the film's ending to the Columbine massacre, which happened while the film was being edited, delayed its release for over two years, until August 2001. A British TV adaptation by Andrew Davies, screened in 2001, re-set the story among senior officers of the Metropolitan Police. And the first decade of the 21st-Century saw two non-English language film adaptations: Alexander Abela's French Souli set the story in a modern-day Madagascan fishing village, and Vishal Bhardwaj's Hindi Omkara amidst political violence in modern Uttar Pradesh.

Other media

Stage adaptations 
London Theatres other than the patent companies got around the illegality of performing Shakespeare by allusion and parody, such as Charles Westmacott's Othello The Moor of Fleet Street at the Adelphi in 1833.

Part of the explosion of the Romantic movement in France was a fashion for re-writing English plays as melodrama, including Alfred de Vigny's 1829 Othello adaptation Le More de Venise. 

In the 19th-Century United States, Othello was often used in parody, sometimes allied with minstrel shows: with the contrast between Shakespearean verse and African-American dialect a source of racist humour.

The Othello story became the rock opera Catch My Soul in 1968, depicting Othello as a charismatic religious cult leader, Desdemona as a naive convert, and Iago as a malcontent cult member who thinks himself to be Satan. Othello is parodied in the form of a rap song in the stage show The Complete Works of William Shakespeare (Abridged).

Audio 

One of the first full-length plays to be released on vinyl was the Broadway production starring Paul Robeson, José Ferrer and Uta Hagen, issued in 1944. Othello has been performed on at least twelve separate occasions on BBC Radio.

Music 

The Willow Song, sung by Desdemona in Act 4 Scene 3, is not an original creation of Shakespeare's, but was already a well-known ballad. As such it has surviving arrangements from both before and after Shakespeare's time.

The play has been a popular source for opera. Rossini's 1816 Otello, ossia il Moro di Venezia made Desdemona its focus, and was followed by numerous translations and adaptations, including one with a happy ending. But the most notable version, considered a masterpiece with a power equivalent to that of the play, is Verdi's 1887 Otello, for which Arrigo Boito's libretto marked a return to faithfulness to the original plot, including the reappearance of the pillow as the murder weapon.

Othello was, with Antony and Cleopatra, one of the two plays which most influenced Duke Ellington and Billy Strayhorn's jazz suite Such Sweet Thunder. Its opening track (itself titled Such Sweet Thunder, a quotation from Shakespeare's A Midsummer Night's Dream) came to stand for Othello telling his tales of travel and adventure to Desdemona, as reported in the play's first act.

Sometimes the order of the play influencing a composer is reversed, as in the appropriations of classical music by filmmakers retelling Othello's story: for example in the film O, in which excerpts from Verdi's Otello are used as a theme for Odin (the Othello character) while modern rap and hip-hop are more associated with the white college students around him.

Bob Dylan's song Po' Boy features lyrics in which Desdemona turns the tables on Othello, borrowing the idea of using poisoned wine from the final act of Hamlet.

Literature 

In addition to his theatrical performances noted above, the play was also central to Konstantin Stanislavski's writings, and to the development of his "system". In particular, the part of Othello is a main subject of his book Creating a Role. In it the characters of Tortzov, the director, and Kostya, the young actor, both partly autobiographical, rehearse the role of Othello in the opening act. A plot-line in Farrukh Dhondy's novel Black Swan involves the central character Lazarus, a freed slave, travelling to London in the time of Shakespeare and authoring many of the plays attributed to Shakespeare, including Othello, in a production of which he plays the title character, and kills himself.

References
Except where otherwise stated, references to the play Othello are to Honigmann, E. A. J. and Thompson, Ayanna (Eds.) "Othello" The Arden Shakespeare, Third Series, Bloomsbury Publishing Plc., 2016.
Except where otherwise stated, references to other works by Shakespeare are to Wells, Stanley and Taylor, Gary (Eds.) "The Oxford Shakespeare - The Complete Works" Second Edition, Oxford University Press, 2005.

External links

 
 
 Othello Navigator – Includes the annotated text, a search engine, and scene summaries.
 
  – lists numerous productions.
 Othello at the British Library

 
1603 plays
Cyprus in fiction
English Renaissance plays
Shakespearean tragedies
British plays adapted into films
Plays adapted into operas
Plays adapted into television shows
Plays adapted into ballets
Plays set in Italy
Fiction about interracial romance
Fiction about suicide
Venice in fiction
United States National Recording Registry recordings
Articles containing video clips
Uxoricide in fiction
Race-related controversies in theatre
Domestic tragedies
Blackface theatre